General Nakamura may refer to:

Aketo Nakamura (1889–1966), Imperial Japanese Army lieutenant general
Kōtarō Nakamura (1881–1947), Imperial Japanese Army general
Masao Nakamura (1892–1939), Imperial Japanese Army major general